The Miriñay River (Spanish Miriñay Río) is a small river in the province of Corrientes, Argentina. It is born on the eponymous wetlands (Esteros del Miriñay) southeast of the Iberá Wetlands, and flows south for about  until emptying into the Uruguay River near Monte Caseros. Its course runs along a wide alluvial plain.

See also
 List of rivers of Argentina

References

Rivers of Argentina
Tributaries of the Uruguay River
Rivers of Corrientes Province